The Superior Court of California, County of Yolo County, is the branch of the California superior court with jurisdiction over Yolo County.

History
Yolo County was one of the original counties formed in 1850 when California gained statehood.

The first Yolo County Courthouse was completed on January 9, 1864; it was designed by the only architect in Woodland, California, A.A. Bennett. The builder was P. McManus; work began on June 26, 1863, and was scheduled to complete by October 1. Earthquakes in 1892, 1904, and 1906 led to the condemnation of the building in 1911.

A new Yolo County Courthouse, designed by William H. Weeks, was completed in 1917. It was placed on the National Register of Historic Places in 1987. As the population of the county grew, the court system also grew to encompass seven separate buildings; a new courthouse was completed in 2015 to consolidate operations into a single building with fourteen courtrooms.

References

External links
 

Superior Court
Superior courts in California